Hidaya Sultan al-Salem, (1936 – 20 March 2001), sometimes transliterated as Hedaya, was a Kuwaiti journalist and author, who owned and edited the one of Kuwait's earliest political magazines al-Majalis in Kuwait City, Kuwait. She was Kuwait's first female to serve as an editor of a publication. She was a feminist and secularist, and she campaigned against corruption and on behalf of women's rights and suffrage in Kuwait. She was the first journalist to be killed in Kuwait since the Committee to Protect Journalists began recording these acts in 1992.

Personal 
Hidaya Sultan al-Salem was born in Shuwaikh, Kuwait, to the ruling family. As a child, she attended the private Koranic girls' school of Mutawia Saleema and the Mutawia Mariam Al Askar until 1946. Her education came to an end when she was married at the age of fifteen. At the time of her husbands' death, she was a widow and a mother of four sons and one daughter.

Career 
Hidaya Sultan al-Salem was a journalist and author, editor and publisher for 40 years. However, she began her career as a teacher. She was the sixth woman to ever become a teacher in Kuwait. While she was a teacher, she started writing articles for Lebanese and Egyptian newspapers.

In 1961, she became a journalist in Kuwait. In 1964, she was a founding member of the Kuwaiti Literary League. She published five non-fiction books while working as a journalist. Two of the books were The Arabs (1965) and Women in Koran. In 1970, al-Salem bought the weekly magazine al-Majalis and became its publisher and editor-in-chief.  She was also the owner of Arab Sport.   In 1972, she became part of a second wave of Kuwaiti women writers when she published a short story "Kharif bila matar" (Translated: "An Autumn Without Rain"). In addition, she published an underground newsletter Children And Women of Kuwait during the occupation of Kuwait by Iraq in 1990-1991.

She was also a member of the Kuwaiti Journalists Association and served on its board as a prominent woman.

Death 

She was shot and killed in Kuwait City on 20 March 2001 while she was being driven to a Women and Culture Conference that was being hosted by the Kuwaiti Women's Association. The conference was being held to declare Kuwait City as the "capital of Arab culture" for a year. On the way, al-Salem was stopped at a traffic stop when Lieutenant Colonel Khaled Niqa al-Azmi got out of his four-wheel drive vehicle and shot six bullets into al-Salem's head the reason al-Salem got killed was because she was attacking the woman of the al awazim tribe and calling them woman with no honor and so on and the tribal people in general do not accept these words in general The Lt. Colonel was a high ranking police officer, and he was wearing a long traditional robe at the time of the shooting.

Investigation
Originally four people were investigated for the murder of Hidaya. Many motives for the murder were reviewed. At the beginning of the investigation, some believed the murder was political. Hidaya had written an article about money being embezzled, and the office in the Gulf Emirate not being used appropriately. Her lawyer believed it was too early to assume Hidaya was killed for political reasons. Another motive included financial problems and disputes with her employees. The investigation led to the actual motive for the crime. A year before the murder al-Salem had published an article, the article had criticized his Al-Awazem tribe. In the article al-Salem had published her thoughts about women dancers in the tribe. The dancers were women that al-Salem's family had hired. The article described the women dancers as 'all temptation and sexual suggestion'. Many members of the tribe took offense to this, due to the fact that al-Salem had talked about the tribe living outside the Kuwait walls. The members of the tribe believed al-Salem was implying that they were not real Kuwaiti people.  Later, al-Salem explained that she did not mean that. The Lt. Colonel was thought to have killed al-Salem to protect the honor of his tribe.

At first, the Lt. Colonel claimed innocence but later admitted that he was infuriated by the criticism of his tribe in her magazine. Later, the Lt. Colonel recanted his confession  and suggested the police had forced the confession. In February 2002, Lt. Colonel Khaled al-Azmi was convicted by a criminal court for the murder of Hidaya Sultan al-Salem and sentenced to death by hanging, which was upheld on appeal. However, the sentence was later commuted to life by Kuwait's court of cassation.

Lt. Colonel Al-Azmi was released in the second quarter of 2019 after 10,000,000.00 KD in blood money was paid to the victims' family in under 2 days which is record breaking.

Context 
Even though the Constitution of Kuwait guaranteed women equality in 1961, women were not granted rights until 1999, which was opposed by the reactionary tribal-fundamentalist alliance.

Hidaya Sultan al-Salem was a campaigner for women's rights and suffrage in Kuwait, as well as a female leader in publishing. Women media professionals surveyed by the Beirut-based Institute for Women’s Studies in the Arab World concurred that important editorial decisions in all media were still invariably made by men. While women were occupying more spots in journalism training programs, they were employed at the same level.

She also played a role in the emergence of women in the literary scene in Kuwait in an era when magazine publishing was a new development.

Impact
While Hidaya Sultan al-Salem was the first journalist killed in Kuwait, she was one of 51 journalists killed while on the job in 2001. The rate of professionals in the media being attacked and killed increased during the year of 2001.

Reactions 
Hidaya Sultan al-Salem wrote articles primarily about corruption in Kuwait. Kuwait News Agency reported 80 percent of her more recent articles before her murder was about corruption.

The fundamentalist tribe alliance banned the publication of books written by two of her peers Aalia Shuaib and Laila al-Uthman.

See also
 Human rights in Kuwait 
 Kuwaiti women

References

External links 
 INCIDENT SUMMARY (Global Terrorism Database)

1936 births
2001 deaths
Assassinated publishers (people)
Kuwaiti feminists
Proponents of Islamic feminism
Kuwaiti activists
Kuwaiti women activists
Kuwaiti journalists
Kuwaiti women journalists
Kuwaiti short story writers
Kuwaiti women writers
Kuwaiti editors
Kuwaiti women editors
Women in publishing
Assassinated editors
People from Kuwait City
People from Capital Governorate
20th-century journalists
People murdered in Kuwait
Kuwaiti murder victims
Violence against women in Kuwait